Alexandr Vondra (born 17 August 1961) is a Czech politician and diplomat who served as Minister of Defence of the Czech Republic from 2010 to 2012 under Prime Minister Petr Nečas and has been Member of the European Parliament (MEP) since 2019.

Vondra also served as Deputy Prime Minister for European Affairs between 2007 and 2009, as well as Minister of Foreign Affairs from 2006 to 2007, both in cabinets of Prime Minister Mirek Topolánek. Vondra is also former Senator from Litoměřice (2006—2012) and Czech Ambassador to the United States (1997—2001).

He was candidate for the European Parliament seat in the 2019 election and received 29,536 preferential votes and was elected Member of the European Parliament representing the Civic Democratic Party (ODS).

Life
Vondra was born in Prague.  He graduated in geography from Charles University in Prague in 1984, receiving a Doctor in Natural Sciences degree one year later. In the mid-1980s he was a dissident and Charter 77 signatory. After organizing a demonstration in January 1989, Vondra was imprisoned for two months. In November 1989, while the Velvet Revolution was underway, he co-founded the Civic Forum.

Politics
In 1990-1992, Vondra was foreign policy advisor to President Václav Havel. When Havel stepped down from his office during the dissolution of Czechoslovakia and at the same time an independent Czech foreign service was being formed, Vondra became the Czech Republic's First Deputy Minister of Foreign Affairs in August 1992, responsible i. a. for negotiating the division of Czechoslovak diplomacy. In 1996 he was a chief negotiator for the Czech-German Declaration on the Mutual Relations and their Future Development. In March 1997 Vondra left to become the Czech Ambassador to the United States, staying there until July 2001. From March 2001 to January 2003, Vondra was the Czech Government Commissioner responsible for the preparation of the 2002 Prague summit of NATO. From January to July 2003 Vondra was a Deputy Foreign Minister.

He became an ODS member only after his ministerial appointment and the victory in Senate elections in October 2006. He is generally perceived as pro-United States and wary of European integration, though less than ODS eurosceptic hardliners, and had good connections to Havel (his announced return to politics in spring 2006 was taken as a sign of ODS trying to appease the political centre) .

Vondra was mentioned as a possible nominee to serve as European Commissioner in 2009.

He participated at the international conference European Conscience and Communism, which took place under his patronage at the Czech Senate in Prague in June 2008.

In November 2012, he decided to step down from politics, due to the loss of credibility following several corruption accusations and his previous relentless effort to pursue the installation of a US military missile radar, despite the prevailing opposition of his fellow Czech citizens.

In  2019 Vondra returned to politics when the Civic Democratic Party nominated him in European Parliament election. He was on 15th place on the party's list. He received 29,536 preferential votes and was elected.

Vondra then ran for the position of Vice-Chairman of ODS. He received 443 votes of 502 which was more than any other candidate and was elected.

Teaching 
After his 2012 exit from politics, Vondra served as director of the Prague Centre for Transatlantic Relations at the CEVRO Institute in Prague, as well as an instructor for both Bachelor and Master level courses at the university.

Family
He is married and has three children with his wife Martina: Vojtěch (1991), Anna (1993) and Marie (1996). He has another child, Jáchym (1992), with Veronika Vrecionová.

Trivia

In 2014, he rejected Noam Chomsky's statements about dissidents in the East European communist countries, and remarked that "at the time when people like Havel were in Communist jails over their fight for freedom, Chomsky advocated Pol Pot's genocide in Cambodia from the Boston cafes" and he warned that if the world listens to "rubbish from these people" it will once again lead to concentration camps and gulags.

References

External links

 
 Vondra's statement at the general debate of the 61st session of the United Nations General Assembly (scanned images in PDF format)

Charter 77 signatories
Czech human rights activists
Czech democracy activists
Defence ministers of the Czech Republic
Foreign Ministers of the Czech Republic
Politicians from Prague
Living people
1961 births
Civic Democratic Party (Czech Republic) Senators
Ambassadors of the Czech Republic to the United States
People of the Velvet Revolution
Civic Forum politicians
Civic Democratic Party (Czech Republic) Government ministers
Charles University alumni
MEPs for the Czech Republic 2019–2024
Civic Democratic Party (Czech Republic) MEPs